L'Hermitage Plantation may refer to:

 Hermitage (Darrow, Louisiana)
 L'Hermitage Slave Village Archeological Site on the grounds of the former l'Hermitage Plantation near Frederick, Maryland.
 The Hermitage (Nashville, Tennessee), home of Andrew Jackson